The Phoenix Metropolitan Area – also the Valley of the Sun, the Salt River Valley, or Metro Phoenix (known by most locals simply as “the Valley”) – is the largest metropolitan statistical area in the Southwestern United States, centered on the city of Phoenix, that includes much of the central part of Arizona. The United States Office of Management and Budget designates the area as the Phoenix-Mesa-Chandler Metropolitan Statistical Area (MSA), defining it as Maricopa and Pinal counties. It anchors the Arizona Sun Corridor megaregion along with the second most populous metropolitan area in the state, the Tucson metropolitan area. The gross domestic product of the Phoenix Metropolitan Area was $255 billion in 2018, 16th largest amongst metro areas in the United States.

As of the 2020 census, the two-county metropolitan area had 4,845,832 residents, making it the 11th largest metropolitan area in the nation by population. Metro Phoenix grew by 652,945 people from April 2010 to April 2020, making it one of the fastest growing metro areas in the country. This also contributed to the entire state's exceptional growth, as the area is home to just over two-thirds of Arizona's population. The population of the Phoenix Metropolitan Area increased by 45.3% from 1990 through 2000, compared to the average United States rate of 13.2%, helping to make Arizona the second fastest growing state in the nation in the 1990s (the fastest was Nevada). The 2000 Census reported the population of the metropolitan area to be 3,251,876.

Combined Statistical Area 
The Phoenix-Mesa Combined statistical area (CSA) was designated in September 2018 by U.S. Office of Management and Budget (OMB) and by the Census Bureau which consists of the entirety of the counties of Maricopa, Pinal and Gila. This includes the Phoenix Metropolitan Area and the Payson, AZ Micropolitan Statistical Area.

As of April 1, 2020, the Phoenix-Mesa CSA had a population of 4,899,104 making it the fourteenth largest in the nation by population.

Metropolitan Statistical Area 

The Phoenix Metropolitan Area comprises Maricopa County (2020 population: 4,420,568) and Pinal County (2020 population: 425,264). It is officially designated by the US Census Bureau as the Phoenix–Mesa–Chandler, AZ Metropolitan Statistical Area. The total population for metropolitan Phoenix at the 2020 Census was 4,845,832.

The Phoenix Metropolitan Area is hundreds of miles away from any other metropolitan area of similar population size.  For instance, the closest metropolitan area with almost the same population size is the Riverside-San Bernardino-Ontario, CA Metro Area, which is 300 miles away.

Demographics

As of the 2010 census, there were 4,192,887 people, 1,537,137 households, and 1,024,971 families residing within the MSA. The racial makeup of the MSA was 73.0% White (58.7% White Non-Hispanic), 5.0% Black, 3.3% Asian, 2.4% Native American or Alaska Native (virtually all Native American) and 16.2% of other or mixed race. 29.5% were Hispanic of any race.

In 2010 the median income for a household in the MSA was $50,385 and the median income for a family was $58,497. The per capita income was $24,809.

Communities
What follows is a list of places in Metro Phoenix (populations for incorporated places are as of the 2020 census). The Office of Management and Budget defines a metropolitan area as the core city plus its county and any nearby counties that are economically dependent on the core city. However, Arizona has relatively large counties and a harsh, rugged desert landscape. For these reasons, much of the land that is part of the Metropolitan Statistical Area is rural or completely uninhabited. The core part of the Phoenix Metropolitan Area is the Phoenix–Mesa, Arizona Urban Area, which is far smaller than the Metropolitan Statistical Area.

Places that fall completely or partially within the boundaries of the Phoenix–Mesa, AZ US are in bold below.

Cities and suburbs

Principal city
 Phoenix pop. 1,608,139

Places with 250,000+ inhabitants
 Mesa pop. 504,258
 Chandler pop. 275,987
 Gilbert pop. 267,918

Places with 150,000–249,999 inhabitants
 Glendale pop. 248,325
 Scottsdale pop. 241,361
 Peoria pop. 190,985
 Tempe pop. 180,587

Places with 75,000–149,999 inhabitants
 Surprise pop. 143,148
 Goodyear pop. 95,294
 Buckeye pop. 91,502
 Avondale pop. 89,334

Places with 30,000–74,999 inhabitants
 Queen Creek pop. 59,519
 Apache Junction pop. 38,499
 El Mirage pop. 35,805

Places with 10,000–29,999 inhabitants
 Fountain Hills pop. 23,820
 Paradise Valley pop. 12,658

Fewer than 10,000 inhabitants
 Wickenburg pop. 7,474
 Tolleson pop. 7,216
 Youngtown pop. 7,056
 Litchfield Park pop. 6,847
 Guadalupe pop. 5,322
 Cave Creek pop. 4,892
 Carefree pop. 3,690
 Gila Bend pop. 1,892

Unincorporated communities

Over 10,000 inhabitants
 Sun City pop. 39,931
 Sun City West pop. 25,806
 Anthem pop. 23,190
 New River  pop. 17,290
 Sun Lakes pop. 14,868

Under 10,000 inhabitants
 Aguila
 Arlington
 Circle City
 Komatke
 Liberty
 Morristown
 Palo Verde
 Rio Verde
 Tonopah
 Tortilla Flat
 Waddell
 Wintersburg
 Wittmann

Geography
As of 2020, the Phoenix Metropolitan area consists of Maricopa and Pinal counties, comprising a total area of about 14,600 square miles. Because of the size of counties in Arizona, even though Maricopa and Pinal counties together contain nearly 4.9 million people, most of the area is uninhabited, which gives the MSA an extremely low density compared to other major MSAs in the nation.

Climate
Metropolitan Phoenix is notable for its warm, desert climate. On average, the area receives about 9 inches of rain annually, with less than 1 inch of snow every decade. In total, the region will see about 32 days of measurable precipitation each year. The MSA is one of the sunniest major metropolitan areas, receiving 295 days of sunshine, compared to the national average of 205. The average July high is about 104 °F (40 °C), with the average January low being about 37 °F (3 °C), still above freezing. Bestplaces gives Metropolitan Phoenix a comfort index of 44/100, which is also the national average.

Below is a chart showing climate data collected from Sky Harbor Airport. Note that due to the vast area covered by the MSA, climates vary throughout the valley.

Economy
Metropolitan Phoenix has historically been the center of the state's economy. As with the state of Arizona, the area relied on the 5 C's (copper, cattle, climate, citrus, and cotton) for its economic growth and expansion. However, after World War II, the area entered the manufacturing industry, which spurred the growth of what would eventually be one of the largest urban areas in the nation. Currently, the two largest industries are manufacturing and tourism. About 10 million people visit from other states and Canada each year, due to the area's mild winters and long, sunny days. The technology and service industries currently account for almost 77% of total employment in the region. As well as a strong tourism industry, the Phoenix area has a significant business sector. Several Fortune 500 and Fortune 1000 companies have their international headquarters in the area, including Avnet, PetSmart, Apollo Education Group, Republic Services, ON Semiconductor, Insight Enterprises, and Sprouts Farmers Market. Other Fortune 500 companies with significant presence include Banner Health, the state's largest private employer, American Airlines, which merged with Tempe-based US Airways, American Express, Wells Fargo, Boeing, and Intel, which has a large regional campus in Chandler.

The Metropolitan Area ranks 5th in the nation in economic growth, which is a major comeback from the recession. The unemployment rate of the area is 5.3%, lower than the national rate of 6.3%. It also has slightly higher recent job growth (2.0% compared to 1.2%) and higher projected job growth (38.7% compared to 36.1%). Although the area has significantly higher sales tax rates compared with the nation as a whole (8.3% to 6.0%), income tax rates are lower than the national average (3.4% to 4.7%). The largest occupation by population is in the office/administrative sector, comprising more than a quarter of all jobs in the region.

Infrastructure

Transportation

Freeways and expressways 

The Phoenix Metropolitan Area is served by several controlled-access freeways, including:
 
 
 
 
 
 
 
 

New freeways are planned in the future, either through upgrades of existing roads such as SR 74, SR 85, and Northern Parkway; or through the construction of new freeways where no road existed before such as SR 24, SR 30, and I-11.

Arterial roads 

Most of the arterial roads in the Phoenix metropolitan area are laid out on a regular grid, following the section lines established in the Public Land Survey System. As a result, arterial roads in cities that had once been geographically separate may have been given different names while occupying the same section line. When these roads were extended to accommodate the growth in the area they eventually merged into a single road while the previous segments retained their existing names. This results in several cases of a road abruptly changing names; for example, Dunlap Avenue in Phoenix becomes Olive Avenue west of 43rd Avenue, in Glendale.

Another quirk of a grid system based upon the Public Land Survey System is due to the occasional corrections in the grid caused by the curvature of the earth. This results in arterial roadways deviating slightly from a straight line, as can be seen in many locations where roads abruptly curve either just north or just south of Baseline Road to follow a new section line.

The majority of the cities in the metropolitan area, as well as unincorporated areas in Maricopa County, observe the addressing system employed by the city of Phoenix. A number of cities, however, retain their own addressing systems with differing reference points, creating the potential for multiple instances of a house number being found on the same named road.

In terms of numbering systems, some roads that continue through multiple cities will switch numbering conventions several times. Broadway Road, for example, starts and stops multiple times, passing through Goodyear, Avondale, Phoenix, Tempe, Mesa, and Apache Junction, each with their own reference point for address numbering. Though the street does not curve, the direction changes from west to east in each city and back again when moving from one city to the next, causing considerable overlap in numbers.

Street numbering systems 

Most communities in Maricopa County use the Phoenix-County numbering system, with the point of origin at Central Avenue and Washington Street. In the Phoenix-County system, north-south numbered roads labeled "avenue", "drive", and "lane" are West of Central Avenue, while those labeled "street", "place" and "way" are east of Central Avenue. Starting with 579th Avenue in the west near Tonopah the avenues count down with approximately 8 numbers per mile to 19th Avenue and count up again to from 16th Street to 228th Street near Queen Creek in the east. They go, in order from west to east (although not all necessarily exist):
 2nd Avenue – 1st Dale – 1st Glen – 1st Lane – 1st Drive – 1st Avenue
 Central Avenue
 1st Street – 1st Place – 1st Way – 1st Terrace – 1st Run – 2nd Street

This has been a source of confusion for a few newcomers, who might end up, for example, at 91st Avenue and Thunderbird Road, when in fact they intended to go to 91st Street and Thunderbird Road, between 30 minutes and an hour away from one another depending on traffic.

One beneficial quality of this arrangement for unfamiliar travelers is that the major north-south arterial roads are rarely similarly named; the "avenue" arterials in the West Valley are all odd-numbered and the "street" arterials in the East Valley are even-numbered, with the exception of 7th Ave. & 7th St., both being major roadways running parallel and each one-half mile from Central Ave.

Communities in Maricopa County that have their own street numbering systems include:

Additional confusion can be encountered in Mesa in its urban core, with east-west numbered avenues and drives counting down from 11th Avenue north towards Main Street), and numbered streets and places counting down from 11th Place south towards Main Street.  Then, in the eastern part of the city, north-south streets and places count up from 22nd St east of Gilbert Rd, to 112th Street on the Apache Junction border.  Numerous trailer parks inside the city limits run their own contradictory variations of the numbered street system.

Most communities in Pinal County use the Pinal County street numbering system, whose point of origin is at SR 287 and 11 Mile Corner Road (the intersection of which is known as "11 Mile Corner"). Exceptions include:

Apache Junction continues Mesa's convention of numbered north-south street names by having the sequence continue east from 112th St while simultaneously having east-west numbered avenues south of Apache Trail and east-west numbered streets north of Apache Trail.

Traffic safety 

In terms of safety, the Phoenix-Mesa-Scottsdale, AZ metropolitan area has been ranked 16th most dangerous in the USA, based on its Pedestrian Danger Index, computed on the share of local commuters who walk to work and the most recent data on pedestrian deaths as found in a 2016 report released by Smart Growth America.

Rail 
Amtrak serves the Phoenix metropolitan area with their Sunset Limited and Texas Eagle trains—both of which stop in Maricopa, located about 40 miles south of downtown Phoenix. Amtrak's Stagecoach Express provides Thruway Motorcoach service from Maricopa station to both Phoenix Sky Harbor International Airport and Tempe station. Amtrak also provides additional Thruway Motorcoach service from Phoenix Sky Harbor International Airport to Flagstaff station, which is served by the Southwest Chief.

Amtrak's Los Angeles-New Orleans Sunset Limited served the city of Phoenix directly from 1971 until it was rerouted on June 2, 1996, to a more southerly route between Tucson and Yuma, Arizona, in order to accommodate the Union Pacific Railroad's desire to abandon a portion of its Phoenix-to-Yuma "West Line." This made Phoenix one of the largest cities in the nation without direct passenger service.

A light rail system (dubbed the "METRO Light Rail") runs more than 20 miles from suburban Mesa, through Tempe and into Phoenix, traveling through the downtown area, offering access to Phoenix Sky Harbor International Airport and linking two of the four metro area campuses of Arizona State University. The light rail began public operation on December 27, 2008, and it was projected to accommodate 26,000 boardings a day, or more than 8 million boardings in its first year.  Valley Metro Rail boardings has experienced constant growth since the beginning. In the year 2012, the light rail boarded just over 14 million people.

Many expansions to the METRO system are currently in the early planning stages, and others are under construction. The Central Mesa extension project, which extends the Main Street line 2½ miles from Sycamore to Mesa Drive in Downtown Mesa, finished construction and opened on August 22, 2015. The Northwest rail project opened March 2016. The project extended the 19th Avenue track from its former terminus at Montebello Ave to Dunlap Avenue, 3 miles north. Many more extensions are funded, with further projects being studied for feasibility.

Aviation 
In 2010, Phoenix Sky Harbor International Airport was the 24th busiest passenger facility in the world and the 10th busiest in the United States, with more than 38 million passengers using the facility. With three terminal buildings encompassing 120 gates, more than 20 airlines offer daily non-stop flights to destinations throughout the world.

Phoenix-Mesa Gateway Airport began commercial passenger flights in 2004. The airport provides service to over 40 destinations.

There are several municipal and regional airports in the metropolitan area that are not used by commercial airlines for passenger flights. They include, but are not limited to, Glendale Airport, Phoenix Deer Valley Airport, Phoenix Goodyear Airport, Scottsdale Airport, Falcon Field, Chandler Municipal Airport, Buckeye Airport, Phoenix Regional Airport, Pleasant Valley Airport, Estrella Sailport, Stellar Airpark, Skyranch at Carefree, Gila River Memorial Airport, Pegasus Airpark.

See also

 2014 Arizona flood
 Salt River Valley
 List of historic properties in Phoenix, Arizona
 List of hospitals in Phoenix

Notes

References

External links
 
 Phoenix.org

 
Metropolitan areas of Arizona
Regions of Arizona